Swimming at the 2013 European Youth Summer Olympic Festival was held from 16 to 19 July 2013. The competitions took place in swimming pool De Krommerijn in Utrecht, that was rebuilt in 2012. A temporary pool was created for training and warming up, which was covered by a tent.

Pieter van den Hoogenband was the tournament director

On the four competition days there were series in the mornings, and finals in the afternoon.

Medal events

Boys' events

Girls' events

Mixed events

References

Results

European Youth Summer Olympic Festival
Swimming
Swimming competitions in the Netherlands
2013
International aquatics competitions hosted by the Netherlands